Erigeron speciosus is a widespread North American species of flowering plants in the family Asteraceae known by the common names aspen fleabane, garden fleabane, and showy fleabane.

Description 
The inflorescence generally contains 2–20 flower heads per stem. Each head contains 75–150 white, lavender or blue ray florets surrounding many yellow disc florets. Flowers bloom from June to October.

The species is similar to E. subtrinervis, the stems and leaves of which are hairy.

Etymology 
The specific epithet speciosus means 'pretty'.

Distribution and habitat 
The species has been found in western Canada and the United States, from Alberta and British Columbia south as far as Arizona and New Mexico, with some isolated populations in the Mexican state of Baja California. It grows in open coniferous forests.

References

External links
Photo of herbarium specimen at Missouri Botanical Garden, collected in Colorado in 1899 — isotype of Erigeron salicinus, syn of E. speciosus
Turner Photographics, Wildflowers of the Pacific Northwest, Erigeron speciosus, (Showy Fleabane) — photos, description, partial distribution map

speciosus
Flora of the Northwestern United States
Flora of the Southwestern United States
Flora of Western Canada
Flora of Baja California
Flora of New Mexico
Flora of the Rocky Mountains
Plants described in 1833
Taxa named by Alice Eastwood
Flora without expected TNC conservation status